The Rogationists of the Heart of Jesus (abbreviated RCJ) is a religious congregation of priests and brothers founded by St. Hannibal Mary Di Francia (1851–1927) on May 16, 1897. The word "rogationist" comes from the Latin rogate which means "pray". 

The spirituality of the congregation is centered on the words of Jesus Christ in the Gospels: "The harvest is rich but the workers are few. Pray, therefore, to the Lord of the harvest that He may send workers into His harvest" (Matthew 9:37–38; Luke 10:2).

Hence, they carry out the mission of: 
praying for vocations to the priestly and consecrated life in the Church and propagating this prayer worldwide. 
caring and promoting the human and spiritual welfare of orphans, needy children and the poor.

Rogationists of the Heart of Jesus
The Congregation of the Rogationists originated in Italy and spread to several other countries in Europe, United States, Mexico, Paraguay, Colombia, Brazil, Argentina, Rwanda, India and the Philippines, among others. In the United States the Rogationists established their first community in 1967 assuming parish work in Mendota, California. At present, there are three Rogationist communities in California. Their houses are in Sanger, Van Nuys and in North Hollywood.

Daughters of Divine Zeal
Mother Mary Nazarene Majone was born in Italy in 1869. At 16 she entered the congregation that was newly founded by Fr. Hannibal. M. Di Francia, with the special mission to answer the command of Jesus; "Rogate-Pray the Lord of the Harvest..." She lived this with remarkable humility in prayer and effective witnessing among the poor, the orphans, the outcasts, the needy... She was a Mother, Teacher, Friend and Servant of all. She died in 1939 at the age of 70. Her life was marked with faithfulness to God, to the people entrusted to her care, to the Congregation where she became the "cornerstone"-the Co-foundress. The process of her beatification started in 1989.

Vocation and apostolate
As an expression of their charism, the Rogationists dedicate their lives in the apostolate in favor of the poor. In various places throughout the world, the Congregation has established orphanages, health and nutrition centers, schools for the deaf and dumb, technical-vocational schools, scholarship programs for poor children, centers for professional management, centers for relief and assistance, parishes and oratories

"I feel a bond of holy friendship with everyone on earth either of my religion or another, rich or poor, employer or worker, humble and needy people or high aristocracy. I have seen a brother and my Lord in everyone of them. The most beautiful things I have desired for me in this life and the next, I have desired equally for all."

-St. Hannibal Di Francia

Fr. Hannibal House (social service center)
Fr. Hannibal House is a non-profit Catholic organization provides emergency help to people in need, regardless of race, religion or national origin. It provides the people of Sanger and the neighboring communities emergency assistance such as: food, clothing, medicine, limited rent and utilities assistance, overnight lodging, gasoline etc.

Fr. Hannibal House operates under the guidelines established by the Board of Directors.

The support for Fr. Hannibal House comes from the community organizations and churches, St. Mary's Parish of Sanger, the City of Sanger, United Way, County of Fresno, the Federal Emergency Management Agency (FEMA), local merchants, St. Vincent de Paul Society of Sanger, the Rogationist Charities and from various donors and benefactors

See also
St. Elizabeth Church and School (Van Nuys)

References

External links
Rogationist of the Heart of Jesus Italian
Rogationist of the Heart of Jesus English

1897 establishments in Italy
Catholic orders and societies